Agropyron is a genus of Eurasian plants in the grass family), native to Europe and Asia but widely naturalized in North America.

Species in the genus are commonly referred to as wheatgrass.

 Species
 Agropyron badamense - Tajikistan, Kyrgyzstan, Uzbekistan, Kazakhstan
 Agropyron bulbosum - Iran
 Agropyron cimmericum - Ukraine, Crimea
 Agropyron cristatum - Crested wheatgrass  - Eurasia + North Africa from Spain + Morocco to Korea + Khabarovsk; naturalized in western + central North America (United States, Canada, northern Mexico) 
 Agropyron dasyanthum - Ukraine
 Agropyron desertorum - Desert Wheatgrass - from Crimea + Caucasus to Mongolia + Siberia
 Agropyron deweyi  - Turkey
 Agropyron fragile - Siberian wheatgrass - from Caucasus to Mongolia; naturalized in scattered locales in  western United States + Canada 
 Agropyron michnoi  - Buryatiya, Zabaykalsky Krai, Mongolia, Inner Mongolia
 Agropyron mongolicum - Gansu, Inner Mongolia, Ningxia, Shaanxi, Shanxi, Xinjiang
 Agropyron × pilosiglume - European Russia 
 Agropyron tanaiticum - Ukraine, European Russia
 Agropyron thomsonii - Western Himalayas
 Agropyron tsukushiense (Honda) Ohwi Ohwi synonym Elymus tsukushiensis Agropyron tsukushiense var. transiens (Hack.) Ohwi synonym Elymus tsukushiensis formerly included
species now considered better suited in other genera: Crithopsis Elymus Kengyilia Leymus Thinopyrum Vulpia'' etc.

See also
 Wheatgrass
 List of Poaceae genera

References

Palearctic flora
Poaceae genera
Pooideae